The Woman of Steel (known as the Telegraph Woman of Steel for sponsorship reasons) is an award in English rugby league.  It is awarded to the player of the year in the Women's Super League; the winner is  determined by a poll of the players in the Women's Super League.

The award was inaugurated in 2018 and the winner will be announced as part of the Steve Prescott Man of Steel Awards in October each year.

On 10 September 2019 the Rugby Football League announced that the award would be sponsored with immediate effect by the Daily Telegraph and be known as the Telegraph Woman of Steel.

2018
The inaugural nominees were Lois Forsell of Leeds Rhinos Women, Georgia Roche and Tara-Jane Stanley, both of Castleford Tigers Women.  The award was won by Georgia Roche.

2019
The nominees were Castleford's Kelsey Gentles, Emily Rudge of St Helens and Leeds Rhinos' Courtney Winfield-Hill.  The award was won by Courtney Winfield-Hill.

2020
No award as the Women's Super League season was cancelled.

2021
Five players were shortlisted for the award: Jodie Cunningham, Emily Rudge (both St Helens), Sinead Peach, Rhiannon Marshall (both York City Knights) and Fran Goldthorp (Leeds Rhinos). Jodie Cunningham was named as the winner of the award.

2022

Six players were shortlisted for the award: Georgia Roche (Leeds Rhinos), Amy Hardcastle and Jodie Cunningham (both St Helens), Hollie Dodd, Sinead Peach, and Tara-Jane Stanley, (all 3 from York City Knights). Tara Jane Stanley was announced as the winner of the award.

See also

 List of sports awards honoring women

References

Women's rugby league in England
2018 establishments in the United Kingdom
Rugby league trophies and awards
Sports awards honoring women